These are the results for the 31st edition of the Ronde van Nederland cycling race, which was held from August 12 to August 17, 1991. The race started in Dordrecht (South Holland) and finished after 878.6 kilometres in Gulpen (Limburg).

Stages

12-08-1991: Dordrecht-Dordrecht (Prologue), 5.6 km

13-08-1991: Nieuwegein-Haaksbergen, 193 km

14-08-1991: Haaksbergen-Raalte, 100 km

14-08-1991: Raalte-Raalte (Time Trial), 43 km

15-08-1991: Arnhem-Tilburg, 187 km

16-08-1991: Tilburg-Heythuysen, 181 km

17-08-1991: Heythuysen-Gulpen, 169 km

Final classification

External links
Wielersite Results

Ronde van Nederland
August 1991 sports events in Europe
1991 in road cycling
1991 in Dutch sport